Pietro Maiellaro (born 29 September, 1963) is an Italian former football player and current manager. 
Gifted with good technique, throughout his footballing career he played as a midfielder, as either a central or attacking midfielder, for several Italian clubs, and is best known for his four-year spell with Bari.

Playing career
After spending his youth career with Lucera, Maiellaro was promoted to the first team during the 1980–81 season and later played for various teams, such as Benevento and Avellino, as well as Palermo and Taranto, before moving to Bari in 1987.

He is best known for his four-year stay at Bari, scoring 26 goals (13 in Serie B and 13 in Serie A) with the biancorossi. One of his most memorable strikes was a 50-yard looping shot from inside the centre circle which sneaked in just under the bar, much to the horror of Bologna goalkeeper Gianluigi Valleriani, on 24 March 1991. Maiellaro earned a reputation as an enormously talented playmaker, displaying exceptional ball skills and scoring outstanding goals. He later moved to A.C. Fiorentina, where he was given the number 10 shirt, although he was not able to repeat his early successes, and faced competition from several other players in his role. 

Afterwards, he played for Varese, Palermo and Cosenza. He played for Tigres UANL during the 1995-96 season before retiring and dedicating himself to coaching.

Coaching career
Maiellaro began his coaching career as head coach of his hometown club Lucera, and then for Noicattaro. He trained Barletta, a leading Serie D team with the goal of earning promotion to the professional Serie C2 league, until 9 January 2007, when he was fired. He currently coaches the youth team of A.S. Bari.

References

1963 births
Living people
ACF Fiorentina players
Association football midfielders
Benevento Calcio players
Cosenza Calcio 1914 players
Expatriate footballers in Mexico
S.S.C. Bari players
Italian expatriate footballers
Italian expatriate sportspeople in Mexico
Italian football managers
Italian footballers
Liga MX players
Sportspeople from the Province of Foggia
Serie A players
Serie B players
Tigres UANL footballers
U.S. Avellino 1912 players
Palermo F.C. players
Taranto F.C. 1927 players
Venezia F.C. players
Footballers from Apulia